Rat candy  is rodenticide. The name is a slang nickname, the exact origins of which are not conclusively known. One possible origin is the way that a rat is attracted to rat poison like a child to candy, another possibility being the use of actual candy, particularly chocolate, as bait when luring a rat into a trap that will lead to its imprisonment or demise.

According to United States Environmental Protection Agency statistics, approximately 13,000 American children were treated for ingesting rat poison in 2004, most mistaking the rodenticide for candy.

Warfarin, an early rat poison, was derived from licorice. Tales of poisoned candy also abound in urban legends.

References

Rodenticides